Caliothrips indicus is a species of thrips. It is a pest of millets.

References

Thripidae
Insect pests of millets